The Opium Cartel is Jacob Holm-Lupo's solo-project away from his other band, White Willow. The project involves musicians from White Willow, Wobbler, Änglagård, Pineforest Crunch, Jaga Jazzist, No-Man, Rhys Marsh and the Autumn Ghost, The Rentals and more. The debut album is entitled "Night Blooms". It was released on Termo Records in April 2009. It is mastered by Jens Petter Nilsen of Xploding Plastix, and feature artwork by Japanese artist Mako.

References

External links
The Opium Cartel Myspace Page
Termo Records
The Opium Cartel on last.fm

Norwegian indie rock groups
Musical groups established in 2009
2009 establishments in Norway
Musical groups from Norway with local place of origin missing